Sylhet Polytechnic Institute or SPI is a state supported technical academic institute located in Sylhet, Bangladesh. It was established in 1955 by the then East Pakistan (now Bangladesh) government. It was named as Sylhet Polytechnic Institute in 1959.

History

In 1955, Ford Foundation established Sylhet Polytechnic Institute along with four other similar institutes at Dhaka, Rangpur, Bogra, Pabna and Barisal. At the beginning, SPI offered 3 years long courses, based on the syllabus of Oklahoma State University. The certificate issued by the then Technical Education Board was Associated in Engineering having provision to undergo Bachelor of Science courses in United States. Its formation and academic course history goes back to the birth of Ahsanullah Engineering College, which is now known as BUET. The campus of SPI was designed by Muzharul Islam and Stanley Tigerman.

Campus View

Admission
The minimum requirement for admission is Secondary School Certificate (SSC) or equivalent certificate with at least GPA 3.50 (65% marks) in average with minimum of GPA 3.50 in mathematics.

Subjects
Electrical Technology
Mechanical Technology
Civil Technology
Electronics Technology
Computer Technology
Power Technology
Electromedical Technology

Notable alumni
Roki Roy (Entrepreneur)
Md Rihat
Jaman BGD

Student organizations 
 MarketoGuys
 Roki Tech

See also
 Sylhet Polytechnic Institute
 Habiganj Polytechnic Institute
 Barisal Polytechnic Institute
 Dhaka Polytechnic Institute
 Satkhira Polytechnic Institute
 Kushtia Polytechnic Institute
 Mymensingh polytechnic institute
 Faridpur Polytechnic Institute

References

External links

Official Facebook Page 

Education in Sylhet
Polytechnic institutes in Bangladesh
Educational institutions established in 1955